Ekemblemaria myersi, the Reefsand blenny, is a species of chaenopsid blenny found from the Gulf of California to Colombia, in the eastern central Pacific ocean. It can reach a maximum length of  TL. This species feeds primarily on zoobenthos. The specific name honours the ichthyologist George S. Myers (1905-1985) of Stanford University.

References

Further reading

myersi
Fish described in 1963